Automobile Products of India (API) was founded in 1949 at Bombay (now Mumbai), by the British company Rootes Group, and later bought over by M. A. Chidambaram of the MAC Group from Madras (now Chennai). The company manufactured Lambretta scooters, API Three Wheelers under license from Innocenti of Italy and Automobile ancillaries, notably Clutch and Braking systems. API's registered offices were earlier in Mumbai, later shifted to Chennai, in Tamil Nadu. The manufacturing facilities were located in Mumbai and Aurangabad in Maharashtra and in Ambattur, Chennai. The company has not been operational since 2002.

History and operations
The main plant and old office for Scooters were located in Lal Bahadur Shastri Marg, Bhandup, Mumbai. Hind Auto Industries Ltd, manufacturing automobile Tie-Rod ends with German collaboration was amalgamated in 1968 and its products were included to API product portfolios. The Aurangabad unit was engaged in manufactured various Automobile components like Clutch and Braking systems for Maruti Udyog, Hindustan Motors, Bajaj Tempo, and Premier Automobiles as original equipment.

In 1987 as part of expansion plan, the Chennai unit was started in Ambattur for production of Clutch and Braking systems.

Scooters and three-wheelers

API Lambretta

API was the first Indian scooter manufacturer. Scooters were initially assembled from Innocenti kits and sold under the Lambretta name. The early models were the Lambretta 48, a 48 cc moped and the D and LD – Series of scooters. In the early 1960s API acquired the rights to produce the Li-150 series 2 model.  This was restyled with a smaller mudguard, smaller legshields, dual seats and press-on side panels.

API Three-Wheeler

Also during this period API sold the API three wheeler Auto Rickshaw, in competition to the Bajaj three-wheeler. These auto rickshaws are still in operation in certain parts of the country, notably in some parts of Tamil Nadu, Karnataka and Kerala.
In 1987, the Company entered into a technical collaboration with Yamaha Japan for technological upgradation of 3-wheeler engines. Also during 1991–92 . The Company's R&D division developed a rear engine version of its Three-wheeler, a front diesel engine version for load carrier application, and a six-seater version of Three-wheeler for passengers application developed.

MAC Scooters

In 1972 Scooters India Ltd acquired exclusive rights to the Lambretta name.  API then sold its scooters under the MAC brand, M.A.C being the initials of its founder (Dr. Muthiah Annamalai Chidambaram). The MAC 175 came on to the market in the same year.

API Lamby
In 1977, API started selling scooters under the "Lamby" name.  The Lamby scooter was remodeled several times, the last of these being the Lamby Polo in 1986. The Polo model had sharp corners and edges, and the styling looked sleeker than earlier models.  Unfortunately it failed to sell and production ceased.

The Lamby and MAC brands are virtually unknown outside India as API's licence prohibited them from selling Lambretta-derived scooters elsewhere.

Model specifications

Model specification source:

Auto ancillaries
The auto-ancillary business consisted mainly of Clutch and Braking systems, apart from tie-rod units and was a principle original equipment supplier for almost all major automotive companies in India. In addition to some of "API" marked components were used by Lambretta scooters themselves.

Brakes and clutches

The ancillary business consisted of manufacturing clutch assemblies in association with Borg & Beck Company (now BorgWarner) of Michigan USA and Lockheed, Fiat and ATE Brakes for hydraulic brakes and API brake linings.
The company, since the 1960s, manufactured brake linings under a licence from Firestone Tire and Rubber Company of Akron, United States. A similar agreement was executed with Fichtel & Sachs A.G. (now ZF Sachs), of West Germany in November 1972 for the manufacture of F & S clutches from 1972 for a period of 5 years.

The Aurangabad unit manufactured in collaboration with Automotive Products (AP) of Lemington Spa, England, clutches and brakes until 1970. Later the Company entered into a fresh collaboration agreement for 5 years with them for the manufacture of Borg & Beck clutches and Lockheed hydraulic brakes on revised terms and conditions.

API also indigenously developed Brake linings and Brake fluids for various other Indian Automobiles including Maruti Udyog.

Decline and closure
In 1984, the company saw increase in sales, but the operations resulted in losses due to a "go-slow" strike by workers in Mumbai and Aurangabad units coupled with substantial rise in input and transportation costs. The Company changed the product-mix at Bhandup, by increasing the production of 3 wheelers. In 1985, the working improved and sales increased by 20% and a new model scooter 'Lamby Polo 150' was launched in the latter half of the year, with styling contracted to a Japanese Design firm, but failed to make any impact with the onslaught of Japanese rivals who entered the Indian market with other associations.

In 1986, sales declined due to competition and recession in the automobile industry. Further, suspension of work in the Aurangabad factory followed by a lock-out from November, 1986, intensified the situation. To sustain the growth in the 3-wheeler market, the Company made all efforts to improve and increases its exports of three-wheelers, particularly of load carriers. Also an additional unit in Tamil Nadu was planned and went commenced operations in 1987.

With the erosion of net worth by 1987, the company was placed under Board for Industrial and Financial Reconstruction (BIFR) as per Sick Industrial Companies Act, 1985 for a period of 1988–89 (15 months). Further efforts to improve three-wheeler sales and a license to manufacture mopeds in Tamil Nadu never materialized. Later the company ceased operations for the three-wheeler and scooter lines and continued with the ancillary units.

The company finally ceased production in 2002. Automobile Products of India Limited currently operates as a subsidiary of Kiyana Real Estate Private Limited.

See also
 Innocenti
 Lambretta

References

External links
 Reclaiming the Lambretta – LineMint

Defunct motor vehicle manufacturers of India
Indian motor scooters
Motorcycle manufacturers of India
Scooter manufacturers
Manufacturing companies based in Mumbai
Indian companies established in 1949
Indian companies disestablished in 2002
Manufacturing companies established in 1949
Manufacturing companies disestablished in 2002